Lactivicin is a non-beta-lactam antibiotic that is active against a range of Gram-positive and Gram-negative bacteria. Lactivicin demonstrates a similar affinity for penicillin-binding proteins to beta-lactam antibiotics and is also susceptible to beta-lactamase enzymes.

References

External links
 

Antibiotics
Acetamides
Lactones
Carboxylic acids